Abdullino (Abdulla) is a rural locality (a village) in Karayarsky Selsoviet of Karaidelsky District, Bashkortostan, Russia. The population was 612 as of 2010. There are 23 streets.

Geography 
Abdullino is located 24 km southeast of Karaidel (the district's administrative centre) by road. Ust-Sukhoyaz is the nearest rural locality.

Ethnicity 
The village is inhabited by Bashkirs and others.

References 

Rural localities in Karaidelsky District